This is a list of radio stations that broadcast on FM 88.6 frequency 88.0 FM MHz:

Australia
 Radio Austral in Canberra, Australian Capital Territory
 Raw FM (Australian radio network) in Coffs Harbour, New South Wales
 Vision Radio Network in Cootamundra, New South Wales
 Planet Radio in Brisbane, Queensland
 Red Dirt Radio in Bundaberg, Queensland
 Radio ENA in Adelaide, South Australia
 Radio TAB in Naracoorte, South Australia
 Radio TAB in Mount Gambier, South Australia
 Radio TAB in Port Pirie, South Australia
 Vision Radio Network in Woomera, South Australia

Bangladesh
 Radio Foorti

New Zealand
Various low-power stations up to 1 watt

Turkey
 TRT-4 at Hatay

United Kingdom
 Heart North Wales in Wrexham and Chester

References

Lists of radio stations by frequency